Sweetwater is a town in Beckham and Roger Mills Counties in the U.S. state of Oklahoma. It was incorporated in 1998. As of the 2010 census it had a population of 87.

History
Named for nearby Sweetwater Creek, the town is at the junction of State Highway 30 and State Highway 152. Sweetwater originated around the time of the Cheyenne-Arapaho land opening in 1892. A post office for Sweetwater was established September 27, 1894 (current zip code 73666). By 1910, the community had an estimated population of 50, two general stores, a dry goods–grocery store, a cotton gin, and a fuel company. The residents expected the construction of a railroad through the area, but none was built, which limited further growth.  The town did expand to about 100 people around the time of World War I, based on being an agricultural service center for the surrounding township, and the postmaster estimated 150 in the 1930s.  However, the population started a decline even before World War II, as improved roads and automobile transportation carried business south to Erick or east to Elk City. 

It severely damaged several buildings in the town, including the church and high school, and destroyed eight homes.

Education
The Sweetwater Public School District is one of the smallest public school districts in Oklahoma. For 2007, it tied with Boley for the smallest high school with 15 students. For a combined district, K-12, Sweetwater finished third behind Boley (51) and Clarita (58), with 60 students.

Transportation
Oklahoma State Highway 6 and 152 run concurrently east-west through the town.   Oklahoma State Highway 30 runs north-south through town.  The Texas border is just to the west.

Hobart Regional Airport (KHBR, or FAA ID: HBR) is about 74 miles southeast.  It features two paved runways, the largest 5507’ by 100’.

The nearest major airport to Sweetwater with commercial connections is Rick Husband Amarillo International Airport, about 125 miles to the west.

References

External links
Information on Sweetwater

Towns in Beckham County, Oklahoma
Towns in Roger Mills County, Oklahoma
Towns in Oklahoma
Populated places established in 2003